Julius Voolaid (also Julius Vollmann; 26 June 1900 – 14 February 1966) was an Estonian politician. He was a member of VI Riigikogu (its Chamber of Deputies).

References

1900 births
1966 deaths
Members of the Estonian National Assembly
Members of the Riigivolikogu